The 2002 United States Senate election in Wyoming was held November 5, 2002. Incumbent Republican U.S. Senator Mike Enzi won re-election to a second term.

Democratic primary

Candidates 
 Joyce Corcoran, Mayor of Lander

Results

Republican primary

Candidates 
 Mike Enzi, incumbent U.S. Senator
 Crosby Allen, Fremont County Commissioner

Results

General election

Candidates 
 Joyce Corcoran (D), Mayor of Lander
 Mike Enzi (R), incumbent U.S. Senator

Campaign 
Enzi stated that his top priorities were education, jobs, national security and retirement security. He had $485,000 cash on hand in June 2002, when Corcoran first filed.

Predictions

Results

See also 
 2002 United States Senate election

References 

Wyoming
2002
2002 Wyoming elections